Bellacythara bella is a species of sea snail, a marine gastropod mollusk in the family Mangeliidae.

Description
The length of the  shell attains 8 mm.

The slender shell has a fusiform shape, attenuated below. Its color is pale yellowish brown. The whorls are rounded, longitudinally ribbed, crossed with white raised lines, banded with darker brown round the upper part. The ribs are  slender, furnished with small scattered granules, running into a simple suture. The outer lip is thickened. The sinus is small and rather wide.

Distribution
This marine species occurs in the Pacific Ocean off Costa Rica and Panama.

References

 Hinds, 1844. The Zoology of the voyage of H.M.S. Sulphur under the command of Captain Sir Edward Belcher during the years 1836-42. Volume II. Mollusca.

External links
  Tucker, J.K. 2004 Catalog of recent and fossil turrids (Mollusca: Gastropoda). Zootaxa 682:1-1295.
   Bouchet P., Kantor Yu.I., Sysoev A. & Puillandre N. (2011) A new operational classification of the Conoidea. Journal of Molluscan Studies 77: 273-308.
 

bella
Gastropods described in 1843